Frank Martin Baron (July 7, 1914, Chicago, Illinois – October 17, 1994) served as professor of civil engineering at the University of California, Berkeley and held an international reputation as an expert in the fields of bridge and roof-structure design, and seismic and wind analysis. He was twice the recipient of the prized Leon S. Moisseiff Award issued annually by the American Society of Civil Engineers (ASCE), and among his manifold professional affiliations, served as chairman of the US Council of the International Association for Bridge and Structural Engineering.

Baron's research interests traced the current of cutting-edge theory in civil engineering design and construction. As an undergraduate architecture and engineering student and masters-level graduate student in structural engineering at the University of Illinois, Baron had the privilege of studying under two premier names in engineering design: H.M. Westergaard, known for his research on the use of reinforced concrete for pavement and dams, and Hardy Cross, an undisputed authority on contemporary structural frame analysis. He formed lasting bonds with both of these scholars, later reuniting with Westergaard at Harvard and Cross at Yale.

After receiving his Sc. D. in structures and mechanics at Harvard University and becoming assistant professor at Harvard, Baron accepted a position on the civil engineering faculty at Yale University as associate professor. While at Yale, Baron further explored his dissertation interest in the shearing stresses of slabs, and also spearheaded the formulation of a new departmental curriculum in transportation studies. After spending four years in Hartford, Baron decided to accept a full-professorship at Northwestern University, where he stayed for seven years. Plasticity and the comparative behavior of riveted and bolted steel joints served as his principal research interests while there.

In 1953, Baron accepted an invitation from the University of California, Berkeley to assume a dual position as director of the Structural Engineering Laboratory and professor of civil engineering. Theory of design and planning became his primary instruction matter. Baron continued to teach at UC Berkeley for another thirty years, and was known by faculty and students alike as an unparalleled educator whose enthusiasm for his research was only matched by his concern for the intellectual and professional growth of his students.

Baron was perhaps best known in the Northern California Bay Area for his structural and earthquake engineering analysis and design work on the Dumbarton, Golden Gate, and Bay Bridges, as well as for his role in designing the roof structure of the St. Mary's Cathedral in San Francisco. Other projects in which he served as consultant include the proposed Southern Crossing Bridge in San Francisco, retrofitting of bridges across Saudi Arabia, the proposed bridges across the Strait of Gibraltar and the Strait of Messina, and the proposed Inter-Continental Peace Bridge (ICPB) which would have joined Alaska and Siberia.

Frank Baron died October 17, 1994, in El Cerrito, California. Always interested in the history and progression of engineering, and its role in society, one of his final activities was helping to ensure that the unacknowledged principal designer of the Golden Gate Bridge, Charles Ellis, gain proper recognition. Baron was also the adoptive father of Peter Yanev, a renowned earthquake engineer and risk management entrepreneur.

Research resources
 Online guide to Frank Baron Papers, The Bancroft Library

1914 births
1994 deaths
Grainger College of Engineering alumni
Harvard School of Engineering and Applied Sciences alumni
Yale University faculty
Northwestern University faculty
UC Berkeley College of Engineering faculty
American civil engineers
20th-century American engineers